At The Beach, Los Angeles (ATBLA) is the organization that promotes and administers the Los Angeles Black gay pride event that occurs every summer. At The Beach is an annual beach party/Pride celebration which exists as the focal point for the black gay pride events, is the largest black gay pride event on the West Coast.

History
At the Beach LA was born out of a small number of friends in Los Angeles, California, in 1988. They understood, as black gay men, that it was common for them to be rejected by the larger black and gay communities. Though the greater black and gay communities mostly refused to include them, these individuals yearned to celebrate and enjoy their identity as black gay men. They hosted a small gathering in Malibu Point Dune beach, several miles away from the LA metropolis, in a place almost hidden from the public. This gathering was a huge success and thus began a movement for black gay pride across the world.

Present
The event, now more commonly known as L.A. Black Pride, is still the most popular and longest running black LGBT event in the western United States.  However, the event has seen a noticeable attendance and interest decline in recent years, primarily due to the new great migration of blacks from the West to states more eastward seeking a more affordable cost of living and/or larger presence of black culture.

See also

LGBT culture in Los Angeles
African-American LGBT community
Black gay pride
UK Black Pride

References

External links
LA Black Pride

African-American history in Los Angeles
African-American LGBT organizations
LGBT African-American culture
LGBT culture in Los Angeles
LGBT events in California
Festivals in Los Angeles
Pride parades in California
Annual events in Los Angeles County, California
Organizations based in Los Angeles